Víctor Pérez (born 9 February 1971) is a Puerto Rican boxer. He competed in the men's light welterweight event at the 1988 Summer Olympics.

References

External links
 

1971 births
Living people
Puerto Rican male boxers
Olympic boxers of Puerto Rico
Boxers at the 1988 Summer Olympics
Place of birth missing (living people)
Light-welterweight boxers
20th-century Puerto Rican people